Treaty 7 is an agreement between the Crown and several, mainly Blackfoot, First Nation band governments in what is today the southern portion of Alberta. The idea of developing treaties for Blackfoot lands was brought to Blackfoot chief Crowfoot by John McDougall in 1875. It was concluded on September 22nd, 1877 and December 4th, 1877. Chief Crowfoot was one of the signatories to Treaty 7. Another signing on this treaty occurred on December 4, 1877 to accommodate some Blackfoot leaders who were not present at the primary September 1877 signing.

Treaty 7 is one of eleven Numbered Treaties signed between First Nations and the Crown between 1871 and 1921. The treaty established a delimited area of land for the tribes (a reserve), promised annual payments, provisions, or both, from the Crown to the tribes and promised continued hunting and trapping rights on the "tract surrendered". In exchange, the tribes ceded their rights to their traditional territory, of which they had earlier been recognized as the owners.

Britain had transferred whatever jurisdiction over "Indians and lands reserved for the Indians" it may have had to the Province of Canada in the 1840s. This authority devolved to the government of Canada at Confederation in 1867 and applied to the area of the North-Western Territory (NWT) and Rupert's Land that came into Confederation in 1870, including the part that became Alberta in 1905. The British government, in an exchange of letters at the time of the transfer of the NWT, sought assurances that Canada would provide the Crown's obligation to First Nations.

List of the Treaty 7 First Nations
 Bearspaw First Nation (Stoney First Nation/Nakoda)
 Chiniki First Nation (Stoney First Nation/Nakoda)
 Blood Tribe (Kainai Nation) (Blackfoot)
 Piikani Nation (Blackfoot)
 Siksika Nation (Blackfoot)
 Tsuut'ina Nation (Sarcee)
 Wesley First Nation (Stoney First Nation/Nakoda)

Context  
In the late 1800s, five Indigenous nations were situated along the southern parts of western Canada. The five nations were the Blackfoot, Piegans, Sarcee and Crees and Blood. They were nomadic populations, which allowed them to move freely following the buffalo herds from which they gained a lot of their resources and were able to live. The five Nations owned their lands and used them for hunting grounds as well as for settlement areas. Their territories started in the southern parts of Alberta and Saskatchewan as well as northern Montana. These plains included vast buffalo hunting which allowed them to sustain themselves and their culture. Buffalo were the foundation of not only the economy of the people of the plains but also of their culture and way of life. The buffalo provided the people of the plains with food, clothing and warmth, fuel and sacred objects. The buffalo were a pivotal part of their way of life and greatly diminished due to overhunting in the plains. By 1879, the buffalo could no longer be found in any significant numbers across the plains leading the people to have different needs and require other ways of life.

The Canadian government wanted to build a railway but in order to proceed, they had to acquire the land from the Indigenous people. The government brought forward the idea of a treaty to the Indigenous people who resided on the land on the plains that was needed for the railway. There were already treaties in place between other Indigenous groups and the government. This was the seventh treaty.

A series of eleven treaties made between the Canadian government and Indigenous peoples from 1871 to 1921. The Indigenous groups in the west were involved in treaties 1-7 which took place between 1871 and 1877. The Treaties covered the area between the Lake of the Woods (northern Ontario, southern Manitoba) to the Rocky Mountains (northeastern British Columbia and interior Plains of Alberta) to the Beaufort Sea (north of Yukon and the Northwest Territories).

The leaders of the plains were interested in signing the treaty because they had concerns about the course of their lives. People had become aware that their resources were rapidly depleting due to overhunting and commercialization of the usage of animals with the Hudson’s Bay Company. Diseases such as smallpox were taking the lives of both the old and the young, and it was becoming increasingly difficult to control the spread of diseases to which there was no native immunity. The plains people and their leaders were also concerned about their future and culture and what the influx of American settlers and traders would mean for their communities. They saw the number treaties as an association with the monarchy and as a way for them to gain the government's protection of their land and resources before American settlers came to take over their territories. They were able to trust that the Queen and her people would keep their word because the Canadian Mounties had done well in keeping American traders out of the North-West Territories.

Signing day: negotiations / treaty terms  

Treaty 7 was signed in September 1877 between the Crown and the five First Nations: the Siksika (Blackfoot), Kainai (Blood), Piikani (Peigan), Stoney-Nakoda, and Tsuut’ina (Sarcee). Treaty 7 was the last of a series of treaties that were signed during the 1870s. It was the last treaty signed between the Crown and the First Nations for the next 20 years. This series of treaties during the 1870s was to determine the division of land. The negotiations of the treaty took place between David Laird (lieutenant-governor of the North-West Territories) and James Macleod (commissioner of the NWMP) who were acting as the Crown's treaty commissioners. The First Nations representatives were largely from the Blackfoot confederacy due to their inhabiting the majority of the land being sought after. The First Nations' representative was the Blackfoot nation who sent Crowfoot to make the negotiations on their behalf.

The signing of the treaty took place at the Blackfoot crossing, a location on their territory. This location was a bit problematic for some of the other nations due to it being quite far from their hunting grounds. The distance factor led to the meeting to discuss the negotiations being pushed back by two days. The treaty commissioners, Laird and Macleod, arrived September 16 along with the Siksika, Stoney-Nakoda and Tsuut’ina. They all agreed to wait two days for the remaining nations to arrive. On September 19 the negotiations began between the commissioners and the five nations. Laird and Macleod began their side of the negotiations with stating the facts about the decline in the buffalo population and how he proposed to help the Indigenous people by introducing new laws to protect the buffalo. The importance of the buffalo to the Indigenous people was high due to their dependence on the buffalo for food. Laird proposed new laws to protect the buffalo along with helping and teaching the Indigenous people how to learn more about agriculture and ranching that would allow a way to transition from becoming less dependent on the buffalo. Laird said to the Indigenous people that the buffalo would soon be gone and it was important for them to move into agriculture and ranching lifestyles and that the government would support them for doing this.

There was also discussion surround annual payments, reserve land and education. The Indigenous leaders and their nations were greatly concerned about continuing to be able to hunt and fish across all of the land. Crowfoot waited for the arrival of Red Crow, the leader of the Kainai Nation and a trusted friend of Macleod before making any decisions with the treaty. Once Red Crow arrived, Crowfoot explained to him to the best of his abilities about what he believed the treaty to be about. Once Crowfoot explained to Red Crow about the treaty and its terms, the treaty was agreed upon by all the leaders and was signed on September 22, 1877. The treaty involved 130,000 km2 of land stretching from the Rocky Mountains to the Cypress Hills, the Red Deer River and the US border. Along with the exchange of land an immediate payment was given to every man, woman and child and the promise of annual payments of $25 to the nation's chief. The government also agreed to pay the salaries of the teachers on the reserves. The last agreement was that each family would be given livestock proportion to their family size. These were the terms agreed upon in exchange for the Indigenous people's land. There is very strong evidence to support that the Indigenous people did not understand that they were surrendering their land to the government.

Content (after negotiations)  
The government wanted the land for the purposes of building a railroad through western Canada. The written treaty covered roughly 130,000 km2 of land from the Rocky Mountains to the west, the Cypress Hills to the east, the Red Deer River to the north, and the US border to the south. Through the treaty, all nations retained the right to use the land for hunting. However, due to their rapidly depleting population of buffalo, the Indigenous people wanted to learn more about agriculture and how to cultivate their own produce seeing as how they would be more sedentary without the buffalo herds. The government brought money, cattle and the promise of education with the intention of teaching Indigenous people the Western ways of living so that they would be able to sustain their populations without the buffalo.

Opinions on what the treaties mean differ across groups. Government officials have been cited as saying that the treaties were contracts allowing the Canadian government to take control of Indigenous lands in return for other types of compensation. Indigenous people thought that the treaties were a way to allow for a connection to be established between the Indigenous people and the newcomers to Canada through the crown. Their interpretation of the treaties were guided by their need for support from the crown and protection to ensure the survival of their people and culture. Indigenous people did not support the viewpoint of the Canadian government as they found it to be narrow minded and restrictive when they felt as though they were looking for a broader sense of financial and general support for their people. The Indigenous people viewed the treaty as a covenant. The Canadian government viewed it as a contract. The difference between a contract and a covenant is that a covenant is conceived under a deity and therefore has a spiritual context and boundedness that includes a higher power as not only a participant but also a guarantor.

The treaty outlined specifics as to rights of Indigenous people and support and protection of the Queen. These included rights that Indigenous people could hunt and fish and had provisions on their land. Their lands would be divided into one square mile for each family of five people (this would be made smaller or larger depending on family size). The treaty outlined the rivers that each Indigenous band could use including their shipments, docking and any other uses for the rivers. $12 from the Queen was designated to each person who was part of any other of the above-mentioned tribes and other amounts of money to people of higher power such as chiefs. Each nation would receive $2000 every year for the benefit of the tribe so long as it is necessary. Every three years the chiefs would be recognized by way of medals, flags or suits. The Queen would pay for teachers when children on reserves desired teachers and there was a means for education. The treaty dictated the number of cows per family depending on the number of persons. And finally, the Queen reserved the right to punish any Indian who violated the treaty.

Implications at the time 
The implications at the time of the treaty were seen in two different ways, through the government's point of view and the Indigenous people's point of view. The Canadian government wanted the treaty to take place to allow them to build the railway across Canada. It was required that the railway went through the Indigenous peoples' land. The Canadian government began the treaty talks to build the railway and for the expansion of settlement. The immediate responses after the treaty was signed from the Canadian government officials was that "since the treaty the Indians appeared more contented and friendly than ever". The government's main concern was about the Canadian Pacific Railway and that it would be built. The construction began in the 1880s and it was completed. The implications for the government of Canada have not been seen until more recent years as it has been trying to reconcile with the Indigenous people of Canada.

The implications for the Indigenous people after the signing of the treaty are seen through their suffering and hardship. The buffalo disappeared more rapidly than expected and the promised support from the Canadian government to transition into an agriculture lifestyle did not happen as quickly and as many expected. The winters following the signing of Treaty 7 were very harsh on the Indigenous people and their nomadic lifestyle. The nations were still waiting on the government to state what land they will be able to claim. They suffered through disease outbreaks and starvation. Once the nations received the land they were given, it largely was unsuitable. The reserves led to poverty, food shortages and residential schools.  Missionaries arrived to provide day schools and residential schools on the reserves.  Issues arose with the reserves that included the lack of space for the number of people, fears the Canadian Pacific Railway would be constructed on their new land and that the land was insufficient and unsuitable. These were the main concerns of the Treaty Seven First Nations. The Treaty Seven First Nations had been given their reserves and plenty of aid from the missionaries but the promised help from the government that was stated in the treaty would take years to fully receive.

Legacy: different interpretations 
Overall, the treaty did not have the positive impact for Indigenous peoples that they initially believed it would. The buffalo disappeared at a rapid rate, and some Nations trespassed on other Nations' land to hunt, and the number of settlers that came to the area increased, putting further strain on the available resources. As well, the support from the Canadian government to help transition to an agricultural lifestyle did not occur as promised, the reserves that the Nations were relocated to had land where they could not support the requirements of the Nations. Additionally, psychological damages from residential schools, and the attempted erasure of Indigenous cultures, have created immeasurable and unseen damages in the lives of the Indigenous population. All these implications of the treaties have contributed to the level of poverty and grievances experienced on the reserves and by Indigenous peoples today. 

Special consideration must be given to the differences of cultures as pertains to negotiations. When comparing the difference in cultures during the treaty signing, it is possible the Indigenous population could have been misinformed or misguided, whether unwittingly or intentionally. The settlers at the time strongly advocated for the treaty to be a written document but the tradition of the Indigenous people was, and still is, an oral one. Due to the treaty being a written document, it is possible that other negotiations were made, which may have persuaded the Nations to sign the treaty, but were not officially reported. These conventional differences lead many to believe the Indigenous populations did not fully understanding the scope and ramifications of the treaties. It is speculated that if the Indigenous people involved had been properly informed of what was entailed in the documents, they would not have agreed to or signed these treaties. 

Recently the Canadian government has been attempting to reconcile with the Indigenous people of Canada. In the 1982 Canadian Constitution, the government provided protection to the Indigenous people and the treaty rights of the Indigenous people of Canada.  However, all the nations involved in the eleven treaties throughout Canada have since been in communications with the government about issues with their land surrenders, improperly performed surveys and fraudulent deals. The talks between the two parties are still ongoing.

See also
 Numbered Treaties
Making Treaty 7
The Canadian Crown and Indigenous peoples of Canada

References

External links 
Treaty Texts - Treaty and Supplementary Treaty no. 7 from the Government of Canada
Alberta Online Encyclopedia Website: Treaty 7: Past and Present
Treaty 7 Tribal Council
Article on Treaty #7

Numbered Treaties
Kainai Nation
Piikani Nation
Siksika Nation
1877 treaties
History of Alberta
Indigenous peoples of the Great Plains
Tsuut'ina Nation